was a popular Japanese ryūkōka singer.

Early life
Shōji was born in Akita, Akita Prefecture. His father was an employee of the South Manchuria Railway, and his parents moved to Manchukuo, leaving him behind in Japan to be raised by his grandmother, who introduced him to the violin. He graduated from the Waseda University Department of Commerce, where he majored in Marxist economics. He married shortly before graduation from undergraduate studies, and was employed by the South Manchurian Railways Research Division on completion of his graduated degree in 1923. His main work at the South Manchurian Railways was on unionization; however, his highly leftist viewpoints alienated both his managers and the Imperial Japanese Army, and he found himself sidelined to a position in a library. After seven years in Manchukuo, he returned to Japan, where his brother was running a Chinese restaurant near Waseda University.

Music career
Shōji made his debut as a recording singer in 1933. He attempted to become a Western classical baritone singer, but finally became a popular singer. His first major hit popular song  written about Kunisada Chūji. The song was released in 1934 and sold 400,000 copies. This song became a model for many lesser known singers in the 1930s and early 1940s about tragic or semi-tragic Japanese anti-heroes. .

From 1934 to 1936, the young actress Hideko Takamine and her mother lived with Shōji, although she refused his offer to formally adopt her.

After World War II, many of his songs were banned by the American occupation forces as too nationalistic. In the 1960s, his popularity revived, riding a wave of nostalgia for songs of the early Shōwa period. Shōji appeared four times on the NHK Kōhaku Uta Gassen, starting with the first broadcast in 1951, followed by 1955, 1956 and 1965. He performed at the Asakusa International Theater in 1957 and in 1963 became honorary chairman of the Japan Vocalist Association in 1963. He was awarded the “special recognition” award at the Japan Record Awards in 1965 and the 4th class of the Order of the Rising Sun in 1969.

Death
Shōji suffered from cancer. However, he recovered from the illness in 1964. He died from cerebral hemorrhage in 1972.

Partial discography 
  : 1933
  : 1934
  : 1936
  : 1938
  : 1938 with Shinbashi Kiyozo
  : 1938 with Bin Uehara
  : 1940
  : 1941

References 
Birnbaum, Phyliss. Modern Girl, Shining Stars, the Skies of Tokyo: Five Japanese Women. Columbia University Press. (2000).

Notes

1898 births
1972 deaths
Musicians from Akita Prefecture
Waseda University alumni
People from Akita (city)
20th-century Japanese male singers
20th-century Japanese singers